Jennifer Erin Decilveo is an American Grammy-winning, Brit and Mercury Prize-nominated record producer, multi-instrumentalist, and songwriter. Her production and songwriting credits include Beth Ditto of The Gossip, Bat for Lashes, Andra Day, Porridge Radio, Miley Cyrus, Demi Lovato, Anne-Marie, Albert Hammond Jr. of The Strokes, Hozier, The Wombats, Rae Morris, Marina, Ryn Weaver, Lucius, White Reaper, and Angelique Kidjo. Decilveo co-wrote and produced Andra Day's Rise Up on her critically acclaimed album Cheers to the Fall. The album was nominated for Best R&B Album and the album's main single, Rise Up, was nominated for Best R&B Performance at the 2016 Grammy Awards. Decilveo and Day are winners  of BET's 2016 Soul Train Music Awards The Ashford & Simpson Songwriter's Award. 
Decilveo also produced Marina's Man's World which was nominated for the 2021 Ivor Novello Awards for Best Song Musically and Lyrically.

Biography
Decilveo was born in New Jersey. She graduated from Lehigh University with a degree in finance from the College of Business and Economics.

Awards and nominations

Mercury Prize

|-
| rowspan="1"|2020
| Porridge Radio - Every Bad
| Mercury Prize
| 
|}

Brit Awards

|-
| rowspan="1"|2019
| Anne Marie - Speak Your Mind
| British Album of the Year
| 
|}

Ivor Novello Awards

|-
| rowspan="1"|2021
| Marina - Man's World
| Best Song Musically and Lyrically
| 
|}

BET Awards

|-
| rowspan="1"| 2016
| Andra Day - Rise Up
| Centric Award
| 
|}

Grammy Awards

|-
| rowspan="2"| 2016
| Andra Day - Rise Up
| Best R&B Performance
| 
|-
| Andra Day - Cheers to the Fall
| Best R&B Album
| 
|-
| rowspan="1"| 2022
| Angelique Kidjo - Mother Nature
| Global Music Album
| 
|-
|}

Soul Train Awards

|-
| rowspan="1"| 2016
| Rise Up
| The Ashford & Simpson Songwriter's Award
| 
|}

Discography

Producer and writer discography

References

Record producers from New Jersey
American women songwriters
Songwriters from New Jersey
Year of birth missing (living people)
Living people
American women record producers
21st-century American women